The Holleville RH.1 Bambi is a French-built light sporting aircraft of the 1950s.

Development and design
The RH.1 Bambi was designed and built by Monsieur Roger Holleville and flown for the first time in 1953. It is a side-by-side two-seat aircraft and was unusual at the time to be among self-build types to make extensive use of synthetic resins and sandwich construction. It was originally intended to make construction plans available to clubs and groups. However, the rather sophisticated design motivated against the acceptance of the Bambi by amateur constructors.

The Bambi is basically of wooden construction and the exceptional cleanliness of the overall design results in an outstanding performance on a 65 h.p. engine.

The aircraft has a low-wing layout and a fixed tail-wheel undercarriage.

Operational history
The Bambi was initially operated by its designer from Guyancourt airfield to the west of Paris. By 1964 it was owned by Monsieur Gerard Chaplain and based at St Dizier.

It has visited the United Kingdom to attend light aircraft rallies including at Biggin Hill airport in Kent in 1967. The Bambi is preserved in airworthy condition in the Musee Regional de l'Air at Angers Aerodrome, 20 km north east of the town.

Specifications

Notes

References

External links
Details of design and construction

1950s French civil utility aircraft
Low-wing aircraft
Single-engined tractor aircraft
Aircraft first flown in 1953